Quentin Collins is the name of several characters featured in the 1966–1971  ABC cult TV Gothic horror-soap opera Dark Shadows. Variations of the character have been played by actor David Selby.

Quentin I
The first Quentin Collins is actually the third one shown in the TV series. This version of Quentin was first introduced in episode #1109 in a storyline commonly referred to as the "1840 flashback".

In the 1840 storyline, Quentin Collins was one of two brothers living at the Gothic mansion known as Collinwood Mansion in the fictional town of Collinsport, Maine. Born in 1808, as the favorite son of his mentally troubled father Daniel Collins, Quentin was the head of the Collins Family, and stood to inherit the entire family fortune. This position brought him into frequent conflict with his scheming brother, Gabriel (Christopher Pennock). Quentin was married to a woman named Samantha Drew (Virginia Vestoff), with whom he had a son named Tad (David Henesy).

Around 1839, Quentin had an affair with Joanna Mills.  After he broke off with her, he took Tad on an ocean voyage, on which  Quentin became close friends with a fellow passenger, Gerard Stiles (James Storm).  His wife Samantha eventually discovered the affair and secretly murdered Joanna, making it look as if she had killed herself.

Quentin was interested in the study of witchcraft. He was not part of a coven, but was eventually framed by Gerard (who was possessed by the spirit of the 17th-century warlock Judah Zachery) and sentenced to execution.  Quentin also fancied himself an amateur inventor and used his knowledge of the occult and supernatural powers to develop a device that he called his "Stairway Through Time". He persistently labored to build his staircase in a cellar room at Collinwood. It was Quentin's belief that ascending the staircase could open a dimensional portal through which individuals could view and even interact with the future. What Quentin never realized, however, was that his staircase also created a divergent parallel reality (This functioned as the genesis for several storylines which took place in parallel universes). Quentin's devotion towards his work gave Gerard the means by which to manipulate and ultimately betray him.

In early 1840, Quentin, Tad, and Gerard Stiles had been off at sea for several months. Gerard comes back to Collinwood with the news for Quentin's wife, that her husband and son Tad had been lost at sea.

When Samantha thought that her husband and son were dead, she began spending more and more time with Gerard. Over time, they fell in love, and he asked her to marry. On the day they got married, Quentin returned. He was shocked to discover that his wife had thought him dead, and had married his best friend.

While his wife decided whom she wanted, either him or Gerard; Quentin began having an affair with his son's governess, Daphne Harridge (Kate Jackson), the sister of Quentin's former lover, Joanna Mills.

Gerard meanwhile had fallen prey to the spirit of a disembodied warlock named Judah Zachary. Judah wanted revenge against the entire Collins family for sentencing him to death for witchcraft in the late 17th century. Judah's spirit took possession of Gerard Stiles and used him as a secret weapon against the Collins family. Working alongside a disreputable mortician named Lamar Trask (Jerry Lacy), who was the son of the 1790s witch hunter Reverend Trask (also played by Lacy), Gerard convinced the local authorities that Quentin was a Satanist and that he had used his knowledge of the dark arts to murder a young woman named Lorna Bell, as well as his own brother-in-law, Randall Drew. Quentin was arrested on charges of Witchcraft and murder, and taken to jail. When his ailing father heard the news concerning Quentin's arrest, he changed his will, leaving the entire Collins family fortune to Gerard Stiles.

Quentin was convicted of witchcraft and sentenced to death by beheading. However, with the aid of Valerie Collins (Lara Parker), and his cousins Desmond (John Karlen) and Barnabas (Jonathan Frid), Quentin escaped being beheaded. At the last minute, Gerard was shot. At the same moment, the head of Judah Zachary burned up in front of the judge in the case. With its destruction, Gerard was free from the possession and confessed that Quentin was innocent, admitting that Judah was responsible for all the deaths. After asking for forgiveness, Gerard died in Quentin's arms. Quentin having been cleared of all charges, eloped with Daphne Harridge. The two left Collinsport forever to make a new life for themselves.

Quentin II
Quentin Collins was born in 1870, in Collinsport, Maine, and had three siblings; two brothers, the eldest Edward (Louis Edmonds), the youngest Carl (John Karlen), and older sister Judith Collins (Joan Bennett). He was the grandson of the matriarch of Collinwood, Edith Collins (Isabella Hoopes). He had loved two children like his own, his niece and nephew, Jamison (Henesy) and Nora (Denise Nickerson). This version of Quentin was the great-nephew of the first Quentin Collins and whose lineage includes several supporting characters peppered throughout the series, including his great-grandchildren Amy (Nickerson), Chris, and Tom Jennings (Don Briscoe).

This Quentin Collins originally appeared in December 1968 as an angry, silent, malevolent spirit haunting a closed off set of rooms in the west wing of Collinwood (along with the ghost of his lover Beth Chavez). Quentin and Beth's spirits befriended the children David Collins (Henesy) and his friend and distant cousin, Amy Jennings. David strongly resembled Jamison Collins. Eventually, they took possession of both children and used them to serve their own interests.

In an effort to save his family, the former vampire known as Barnabas Collins, used the cosmological principles of the I Ching to send his spirit backwards through time to the year 1897 (Unfortunately for Barnabas, this meant becoming a vampire once again as such was his physical state during that time period). This series of episodes is commonly referred to as the "1897 flashback".

Like the first Quentin, the second also was secretly involved in the occult and practiced witchcraft. He was a member of a witches coven headed by his best friend, the Collins family lawyer Evan Hanley (Humbert Allen Astredo).

In 1897, Quentin had earned himself a reputation of being the black sheep of the family – due largely in part to his marriage and subsequent abuse of a girl named Jenny (Marie Wallace). Quentin's affair with his brother Edward's wife Laura (Diana Millay), and his running off to Egypt with Laura resulted in Jenny Collins going insane. While Quentin was away, Jenny had two babies, a boy and a girl. Along with Beth Chavez, Edward and Judith Collins conspired to keep Jenny hidden from the rest of the family by imprisoning her inside of the tower room at Collinwood. Edward and Judith wanted to keep any knowledge of the babies from their father and the rest of the world. To that end they gave Jenny's children to Ms. Filmore in Collinsport, who would raise the children as her own. Amy, Chris, and Tom Jennings are descendant from the female child (Lenore Filmore).

When Quentin returned from Egypt in the spring of 1897, his wife was nowhere to be found. He turned his attention to his grandmother Edith Collins (Isabella Hoopes), who was ill and near death. Quentin hoped that she would leave the Collins wealth and control of Collinwood to him. When she died, in an attempt to make that hope a reality, Quentin had Jamison Collins steal the will from the lining of Edith Collins' coffin. The will left everything to Edith's favorite, Edward. Quentin was only guaranteed a room at Collinwood for the rest of his life, but given no money. So Quentin went so far as to have Evan Hanley get Sandor Racosi (Thayer David) to make a fake will.

Quentin was being haunted by the ghost of Edith, and thought that Barnabas Collins was plotting against him. Being suspicious of his mysterious cousin from England, and believing he would try to interfere in his plans, Quentin and Hanley did a black magic ritual asking for help to defeat their enemies. Using the innocence of his young nephew Jamison as a focal point, they manage to summon a powerful spirit. The ritual resurrected from Hell the powerful witch Angelique (Lara Parker). But due to her own interests in Barnabas, Angelique wouldn't help.

Barnabas Collins stole the fake will, and had Sandor now under his vampiric control to change it, leaving everything to Judith Collins. Angelique warned Barnabas about Quentin being out to destroy him. Quentin had Jamison steal Barnabas's cane which he then uses in a ritual to cause Barnabas great pain. Had Barnabas been mortal instead of a vampire, the ritual would have killed him.

Soon after, Quentin's insane wife Jenny escaped from the tower room and stabbed Quentin to death. Quentin possesses the body of Jamison. Barnabas, not wanting to fail at his mission to save the future Collins family from Quentin's ghost, asked Angelique to restore Quentin to life. However, Angelique was jealous of Barnabas latest love interest Rachel Drummond. So she turned Quentin into a zombie, and had him try to take Rachel back to the grave with him.

Due to Jamison's strange behavior of acting like Quentin, Edward Collins decides to send Jamison and Nora to the Worthington Hall Boarding School operated by Reverend Gregory Trask. Barnabas tried to resurrect Quentin, but the ritual failed because Quentin wouldn't leave Jamison's body. Yet, Barnabas was able to save Rachel. Reverend Trask's prayer was apparently answered when Quentin was restored to life, and Jamison was no longer possessed by Quentin, although Angelique was apparently the one that actually used her powers to do it for her own reasons.

After returning from the dead, Quentin had increased paranoia about Jenny trying to kill him again. It was at this time that Magda (Grayson Hall) and Sandor Racosi (Thayer David) discovered that Jenny was still alive. It turns out that she was Magda's sister, a gypsy that had run away from home and married Quentin. None of the Collins family had known that she was a gypsy, so it was a shock to Judith, Edward, and the rest of the family.

Magda threatened to curse Quentin if he did anything more to hurt her sister. Quentin, however, was more worried about Jenny hurting him or his beloved Beth Chavez. When Jenny catches Quentin and Beth kissing, she attacks him with a knife. In self-defense he kills Jenny. With the help of his brother Edward, in order to protect the Collins name, Jenny's death is covered up as an accidental fall down the stairs. Magda finds a button from Quentin's suit in Jenny's hand, and can easily tell that Jenny didn't die from a fall, but was strangled. So she makes plans to curse Quentin.

Quentin, believing that he was already cursed, and thinking he was haunted by the ghost of Jenny, went to Magda and tried to persuade her to lift the curse. His sister Judith gave him $10,000, in return for Quentin signing away his right to live at Collinwood. Magda and Sandor took the money, and said the curse was lifted, having a drink to the agreement. Then Magda threw the money back at him and informed Quentin that the drink he had just consumed contained the curse.

Quentin soon discovered that he had inherited a curse that transformed him into a werewolf whenever the moon was full. He had no memory of what he did as a werewolf. The transformation itself was painful and unbearable for Quentin. He was tormented by the blood of innocent victims he found on himself the morning after. Barnabas, sympathetic to Quentin's plight, tried to help him overcome the curse, but to no avail. He did, however, succeed in altering Quentin's destiny, preventing the creation of the future timeline where Quentin's spirit plagued Collinwood. (In scenes when Quentin became a werewolf, the character was played by Alex Stevens.) 

Quentin felt hopeless and contemplated suicide as the only way out. But Magda, having discovered that she had not only cursed Quentin, but also her sister Jenny's children for all eternity, decided to try to help find a cure for Quentin. Magda had heard of a magical hand possessed by a gypsy tribe controlled by King Johnny Romano. Magda went away to find the magical hand of Count Petofi and stole it. She returned to Collinwood, with the hand, in hopes of lifting the werewolf curse from Quentin and his first-born male descendants. However, the hand's powers were uncontrollable, and it did as it pleased.

Then the powerful warlock Count Petofi, and his servant Aristede arrived in Collinsport, looking for his all-powerful hand. After causing much trouble for the Collins family by possessing Jamison Collins with his own spirit, Petofi pressured Barnabas and Quentin to yield the magical hand. Barnabas and Quentin felt compelled to do so or risk Jamison dying, and with him the entire future of the Collins family. So they gave Petofi back his hand.

Reverend Gregory Trask had become suspicious of Quentin and his strange behavior. He discovered Quentin with chains in his room, and Quentin confessed that he was the werewolf, and wanted to be killed. Trask, wanting to make sure Quentin was the werewolf, took him to a cell in the basement, and waited for the moon. Yet, Quentin didn't change that night. Upon arriving back at his room, he met Count Petofi, who showed Quentin his portrait, and that it had changed into the werewolf instead of him. Petofi said he would expect the debt of curing Quentin to be paid at some point in the future.

Not only did the portrait cure Quentin of lycanthropy, but he was also rendered immortal due to the efforts of the artist Charles Delaware Tate (Roger Davis), whose powers were a gift of Count Petofi. In a pastiche of Oscar Wilde's The Picture of Dorian Gray, at the request of Count Petofi, Tate painted a portrait of Quentin Collins. So long as the portrait remained intact, Quentin would remain forever young, and the portrait would change into the werewolf instead of Quentin himself.

Quentin soon discovered that the price Count Petofi expected to be paid was his now immortal body. Count Petofi wanted to escape the gypsies, who wanted his powerful hand for themselves. Petofi used his powers to swap bodies with Quentin. Using Barnabas Collins' method of time travel, the I Ching wands, Petofi travelled 70 years into the future. In Quentin's body he would be forever young, and free from any threat from his gypsy enemies. However, something went wrong with Petofi's spell. The powers returned to the hand in his old body. Quentin used the powers of the hand to reverse the body swap. Before Petofi could swap bodies again, Quentin left Collinsport. Petofi apparently died in a fire at Tate's studio before he could possess Barnabas Collins' body, who he realized also existed in the future.

Quentin was still alive and wandering the streets of Collinsport by the year 1969. An amnesiac calling himself Grant Douglas (whose initials, G.D., were reversed from those of Dorian Gray), he reunited with Barnabas Collins and soon regained his true memories. He worked closely alongside Barnabas and his trusted companion Dr. Julia Hoffman (Grayson Hall), and aided them against the likes of Angelique and the Cult of the Leviathans.

During this time, Quentin discovered that his lycanthropy had passed along his family line, affecting his descendant Chris Jennings (Chris' twin brother, Tom, ironically enough became a vampire).

Night of Dark Shadows
In 1971, Metro-Goldwyn-Mayer released Night of Dark Shadows, a sequel to the 1970 film House of Dark Shadows. Although both films presumably share continuity with one another, they exist independently of the television series. Once again, David Selby resumed the role of Quentin Collins as well as that of his character's ancestor, Charles Collins. In Night of Dark Shadows, Quentin Collins is an artist who inherits Collinwood after the passing of the last remaining family member, Elizabeth Collins Stoddard.

Along with his wife Tracy (Kate Jackson), Quentin becomes the victim of Angelique – a witch who died over a century ago. Angelique's spirit operates in tandem with that of her 19th century lover, Charles Collins and slowly subverts Quentin's will. Before long, Quentin's soul is consumed by the evil of Charles Collins and he begins stalking his wife and friends.

Dark Shadows audio drama
Based on a stage play performed at a Dark Shadows convention, Return to Collinwood is an audio drama written by David Selby's son, Jamison Selby and Jim Pierson centered around Quentin Collins return to Collinwood. It starred most of the original cast, including David Selby (Quentin Collins), Kathryn Leigh Scott (Maggie Evans), John Karlen (Willie Loomis), Nancy Barrett (Carolyn), Lara Parker (Angelique), and many more.

In 2006, Big Finish Productions continued the Dark Shadows saga with an original series of audio dramas, starring most of the original cast, with the addition of David Selby's son Jamison, and other talented voice actors. Like Return to Collinwood, Quentin Collins is the central character, and the first season dealt with Quentin's return to Collinwood, and his attempts to re-establish the Collins family.

The first season comprises four discs, featuring David Selby (Quentin Collins), Lara Parker (Angelique), Kathryn Leigh Scott (Maggie Evans), and John Karlen (Willie Loomis). More information and online ordering can be found at https://www.bigfinish.com/hubs/v/dark-shadows.

Big Finish Productions

More recently, the character has appeared in a series of audio plays produced by Big Finish Productions.

Season 1
The House of Despair
The Book of Temptation
The Christmas Presence
The Rage Beneath

Season 2
Kingdom of the Dead

Dramatic readings
The Skin Walkers
The Path of Fate
Blood Dance
London's Burning
The Creeping Fog

Powers and abilities
 Knowledge of witchcraft and sorcery, adept at summoning and cursing.
 As a ghost, had vast paranormal powers including, teleportation, mind control, possession of children, and the usual haunting abilities associated with a poltergeist.
 Werewolf physiology gave the potential to transform into a berserk, wolf creature with enhanced strength, speed, and sense of smell, and gave him accelerated healing from any injury or wound, except for wounds caused by silver weapons or bullets. A magical portrait changed into the werewolf on the three nights of the full moon instead of Quentin.
 Eternal youth, due to magical portrait of him, painted in 1897.
Cursed portrait also made him virtually unkillable. Any illness, injury, or fatal wound was healed without scarring by the portrait. However, it didn't protect him from magical attacks such as love spells. Nor did it prevent memory loss due to head trauma.

See also
 List of Dark Shadows characters

References

Further reading

 Clute, John and Grant, John. The Encyclopedia of Fantasy. St. Martin's Press, 1999. p. 250. 
 Day, William Patrick. Vampire Legends in Contemporary American Culture: What Becomes a Legend Most. University Press of Kentucky, 2002. p. 177. 
 Fonseca, Anthony J. and Pulliam, June Michele. Hooked on Horror: A Guide to Reading Interests in Horror Fiction. Libraries Unlimited, 2003. p. 389. 
 Hamrick, Craig. Barnabas & Company: The Cast of the TV Classic Dark Shadows. iUniverse, 2003. p. 100. 
 Jamison, R.J. Grayson Hall: A Hard Act To Follow. p. 148. iUniverse, 2006. 
 Krensky, Stephen. Werewolves. Lerner Publications, 2007. p. 40. 
 Mansour, David. From Abba to Zoom: A Pop Culture Encyclopedia Of The Late 20th Century.  Andrews McMeel Publishing, 2005. p. 109. 
 McKechnie, Donna and Lawrence, Greg. Time Steps: My Musical Comedy Life. Simon and Schuster, 2006. p 76. 
 Parker, Lara. Dark Shadows: The Salem Branch. Tor/Forge, 2006. 
 Riccardo, Martin V. Vampires Unearthed: The Complete Multi-media Vampire and Dracula Bibliography. Garland Publishing, Incorporated, 1983. p. 59. 
 Senn, Bryan and Johnson, John. Fantastic Cinema Subject Guide: A Topical Index to 2500 Horror, Science Fiction, and Fantasy Films. McFarland & Co, 1992. p. 272. 
 Terrance, Vincent. The Complete Encyclopedia of Television Programs, 1947-1979. A. S. Barnes & Company, 1979. p. 225.

External links
 Quentin Collins image gallery at Hollywood.net
 
 David Selby's official web site
DarkShadows.com - David Selby

Articles about multiple fictional characters
Dark Shadows characters
Fictional characters from Maine
Fictional characters with accelerated healing
Fictional ghosts
Fictional werewolves
Fictional wizards
Television characters introduced in 1968
Male characters in television
Fictional people from the 19th-century